Ships and People is a 1920 German silent film directed by Carl Boese and starring Aud Egede-Nissen, Karl Falkenberg, and Otto Gebühr.

Cast
In alphabetical order

References

External links

Films of the Weimar Republic
Films directed by Carl Boese
German silent feature films
German black-and-white films
Films set in Singapore
Films set in the Indian Ocean